A gull is a bird in the family Laridae.

Gull or gulls may also refer to:

Other animals
 Cepora, a genus of butterflies commonly called the Gulls
 Gull Dong, a breed of dog
 Gull Terrier, a breed of dog

Business
 Gull Petroleum
 Gull (record label), a UK record label active between 1974 and 1984

Geography
 Gull Glacier
 Gull Island (disambiguation)
 Gull Lake (disambiguation)
 Gull River (disambiguation)
 Gull (geology), a valley-side chasm associated with cambering

People
 Gull (surname), list of people with this name
 Ernests Gulbis, a Latvian tennis player nicknamed "The Gull"

Sports
 Salt Lake City Gulls, a former AAA minor league baseball team (1975–84)
 Newport Gulls, a summer collegiate baseball franchise currently in the NECBL
 San Diego Gulls (disambiguation), five different minor league hockey franchises
 Sylvan Lake Gulls, baseball team in the Western Canadian Baseball League

Transportation
 Gull (dinghy), a sailing dinghy designed by Ian Proctor, in 1956
 Bonney Gull, an airplane with folding wings designed by Leonard Warden Bonney
 Gull wing, an aircraft's wing configuration with a prominent bend somewhere along the span, similar to that of a gull 
 HMAS Gull, a ton class minesweeper
 Percival Gull, a British low-wing, wood-and-fabric monoplane
 The Gull, an international passenger train
 USS Gull, three ships in the United States Navy